The 2007–08 season was Ross County's first season back in the Scottish Second Division, having been relegated from the Scottish First Division at the end of the 2006–07 season. They also competed in the Challenge Cup, League Cup and the Scottish Cup.

Summary
Ross County finished first in the Second Division and were promoted to the First Division. They reached the second round of the Challenge Cup, the second round of the League Cup and the fifth round of the Scottish Cup.

Management
The club started the 2007–08 season under the management of Dick Campbell, who had been appointed during pre season following the resignation of Scott Leitch. On 2 October 2007, Campbell was sacked as manager with player coach Derek Adams being appointed as temporary manager. Adam's position was made permanent in November.

Results and fixtures

Scottish Second Division

Scottish Challenge Cup

Scottish League Cup

Scottish Cup

League table

Player statistics

Squad 

|}

See also
 List of Ross County F.C. seasons

References

Ross County
Ross County F.C. seasons